Babb's Bridge is a covered bridge spanning the Presumpscot River on Hurricane Road, between the towns of Gorham and Windham in Cumberland County, Maine.  Built in 1976, it is a replica of a 19th-century bridge that stood on the site until destroyed by arson in 1973.  The 1973 bridge was listed on the National Register of Historic Places in 1972.

Description and history
Babb's Bridge is located on the Presumpscot River, carrying Hurricane Road between central-western Windham on the east side and northern Gorham on the west side. It is covered by a gabled roof, and its side and end walls are finished in vertical board siding.

The present bridge is a reconstruction, dedicated in 1976, of an earlier bridge, which was destroyed by arson in 1973.  The exact date of construction of the older bridge is a matter of debate.  Some sources give a date as early as 1843, while the state and other sources maintain a date of 1864.  The 19th-century bridge was listed on the National Register of Historic Places in 1972 as a joint effort of the Windham and Gorham Historical Societies.  Following its destruction, the towns petitioned the state to build a replica, instead of replacing the bridge with a modern structure of steel and concrete.  The present bridge was built, in part as a community effort with donated materials and labor, using techniques that might have been used in the construction of the original.

In 2014, vandals cut holes in its roof to allow people to jump into the river below.

See also
National Register of Historic Places listings in Cumberland County, Maine
List of bridges on the National Register of Historic Places in Maine
List of Maine covered bridges

References

Covered bridges on the National Register of Historic Places in Maine
Bridges completed in 1843
Bridges completed in 1973
Bridges in Cumberland County, Maine
Buildings and structures in Gorham, Maine
Buildings and structures in Windham, Maine
1843 establishments in Maine
National Register of Historic Places in Cumberland County, Maine
Road bridges on the National Register of Historic Places in Maine
Wooden bridges in Maine
Covered bridges in the United States destroyed by arson